Bert H. Soper (15 March 1884 – 2 July 1968) was a Canadian businessman and politician. Soper served as a  Liberal party member of the House of Commons of Canada. He was born in Frankville, Ontario and became a merchant by career.

Soper became director of Allan Soper and Company, a coal sales company. He was also involved with Smiths Falls Malleable Castings Ltd.

He was first elected to Parliament at the Lanark riding in the 1940 general election after unsuccessful campaigns there in 1930 and 1935. Soper was defeated in the 1945 election by William Gourlay Blair of the Progressive Conservative party.

References

External links
 

1884 births
1968 deaths
Canadian merchants
Liberal Party of Canada MPs
Members of the House of Commons of Canada from Ontario